Herman Penkov (born 26 May 1994) is a professional Ukrainian football goalkeeper who last plays for Mynai.

Career
Penkov is a product of the Knyazha Shaslyve and Metalurh Donetsk sportive schools.

After dissolution of Metalurh Donetsk in 2015, he was signed by FC Stal Kamianske and made his debut for main-squad FC Stal in the winning game against FC Zorya Luhansk on 16 July 2017 in the Ukrainian Premier League.

References

External links
Profile at FFU Official Site  (Ukr)

1994 births
Living people
Sportspeople from Makiivka
Ukrainian footballers
Ukrainian expatriate footballers
Ukrainian Premier League players
Armenian Premier League players
FC Stal Kamianske players
FC Karpaty Lviv players
FC Olimpik Donetsk players
FC Lviv players
FC Pyunik players
FC Mynai players
Association football goalkeepers
Expatriate footballers in Armenia
Ukrainian expatriate sportspeople in Armenia
Ukraine under-21 international footballers